The Diocese of Gisipa is a home suppressed and titular see of the Roman Catholic Church, suffragan of the Archdiocese of Carthage.

Location
The bishopric of Gisipa, was centered on a Roman town called Gisipam, the location of which is now lost to history,  although being in Africa Proconsularis it is certain that it was in what is modern north Tunisia.

History
The sources mention four bishops. 
The Catholic bishop, Gennaro attended the Council of Carthage (411)
Carissimo took part in the Synod of Carthage in 484 called by the Vandal king Huneric, after which Carissimo was exiled
Redento attended the Council of Carthage (525)
Melloso signed the anti-monothelitism canon of 646.

Today Gisipa survives as titular bishop, the current bishop is Vitorino José Pereira Soares, Auxiliary Bishop of Porto.

References

Roman towns and cities in Africa (Roman province)
Catholic titular sees in Africa